Two Tails is a 2018 Russian 3D computer-animated science-fiction adventure comedy film directed by Victor Azeev and co-directed by Natalia Nilova, from a script by Vasily Rovensky. Produced by Licensing Brands, the film had its world premiere in Russia on 25 May 2018, and was released theatrically in Russia on 31 May to mixed reviews. It had a worldwide gross of $3,390,149.

Premise 
Best friends Max, a restless and adventurous cat, and Bob, a serious and determined beaver, embark on a dangerous mission to rescue their friends who were abducted by aliens.

Production 
The film was produced by Licensing Brands LLC. Production began in June 2015, and the film was granted funding from the Cinema Foundation of Russia on 14 June 2016.

Release and reception 
Two Tails received its world premiere in Russia on 25 May 2018, before being released theatrically in Russia on 31 May by CaroProkat.

Box office 
In its opening weekend in Russia, the film grossed 44.660 million Russian rubles ($688,933), entering the top five films of that week. By the end of its theatrical run, it grossed 107 million rubles ($1,682,413). The second highest-grossing country was Poland, where it was the fifth highest-grossing film at their box office in its first and second weeks, with 12,371 and 33,955 tickets sold respectively. At the end of its run, it grossed $438,886 from 99,082 total tickets sold, adding to its worldwide total of $3,390,149.

Critical reception 
The film received mixed to average reviews from critics, with particular criticism aimed towards its storyline and clichés, but received positive reviews for its characters and entertainment value for its age demographic.

References

External links 

Two Tails at Film.ru (in Russian)
Two Tails at KinoPoisk (in Russian)

2018 films
2018 animated films
2018 computer-animated films
2018 3D films
3D animated films
Russian 3D films
2018 comedy films
2010s children's animated films
Russian adventure comedy films
Animated adventure films
Animated comedy films
Animated films about cats
Films about rodents
Animated films about extraterrestrial life
2010s Russian-language films